This is a timeline documenting events of Jazz in the year 1939.

Events
The earliest formal books on jazz begin to appear, including Wilder Hobson's American Jazz Music and Frederick Ramsey and Charles Edward Smith's Jazzmen.
Fletcher Henderson becomes the first black musician who is a regular member of a white big band when he joins Benny Goodman, although he does not became a featured artist in the band.
Charlie Christian makes some revolutionary electric guitar records which allow to the guitar to play lead with the trumpet and the saxophone for the first time.
The Duke Ellington Band experiences major success. Django Reinhardt records "Montmartre", "Solid Old Man", "Low Cotton" and "Finesse" with the band.

Standards

Deaths

 February
 9 – Herschel Evans, tenor saxophonist (born 1909).

 May
 19 – Louis Douglas, American dancer, choreographer, and music businessman (born 1889).

 June
 4 – Tommy Ladnier, American jazz trumpeter (born 1900).
 16 – Chick Webb, American jazz and swing music drummer as well as a band leader (born 1905).

 December
 22 – Ma Rainey, Blues singer (born 1882).

 Unknown date
 Charlie Irvis, American jazz trombonist (born 1899).
 John Robichaux, American jazz bandleader, drummer, and violinist (born 1866).

Births

 January
 3
 Brian Smith, American saxophonist.
 Dianne Brooks, American singer (died 2005).
 15 – Hartmut Geerken, German musician and composer.
 19 – Sam Brown, guitarist (died 1977).
 22 – Alan Silva, American upright bassist and keyboarder.
 28 – Dick Griffin, American trombonist.
 29 – Jeanne Lee, American singer (died 2000).

 February
 1 – Joe Sample, American pianist, keyboarder and composer (died 2014).
 5 – Derek Wadsworth, English trombonist, composer, and arranger (died 2008).
 6 – Jair Rodrigues, Brazilian singer (died 2014).
 7 – Niels Jørgen Steen, Danish pianist and orchestra leader.
 11 – Okay Temiz, Turkish percussionist and drummer.
 14 – Chris Pyne, English trombonist (died 1995).
 15 – Csaba Deseo, Hungarian violinist.
 17 – Bruce Cale, Australian upright bassist and composer.
 24 – Abu Talib (musician), African-American guitarist, singer, and harmonica player (died 2009).
 26 – Trevor Watts, English alto and soprano saxophonist.
 28 – Charles Gayle, American saxophonist, pianist, bass clarinetist, bassist, and percussionist.

 March
 14 – Rosa King, American saxophonist/singer (died 2000).
 19 – Mike Longo, American pianist and composer.
 20 – Larry Harlow, American pianist.
 21 – Christer Boustedt, Swedish saxophonist and actor (died 1986).

 April
 4 – Hugh Masekela, South African trumpeter, singer, and composer (died 2018).
 18 – Jorge Anders, Argentinian saxophonist, clarinetist and composer. 
 23 – Patrick Williams, American composer, arranger, and conductor (died 2018).

 May
 11 – Carlos Lyra, Brazilian singer and bossa-composer.
 19
 Sonny Fortune, American saxophonist (died 2018).
 Richard Teitelbaum, American keyboardist (died 2020).
 22 – Dick Berk, American drummer and bandleader (died 2014).
 23
 Marvin Stamm, American trumpeter.
 Michel Colombier, French keyboarder and composer (died 2004).
 25 – Phil Ranelin, American trombonist.
 28 – Wojciech Karolak, Polish-born organist (died 2021).

 June
 8 – Bill Watrous, American trombonist (died 2018).
 14 – Kent Carter, American upright bassist.
 16
 Albert Dailey, American pianist (died 1984).
 Lou Gare, English saxophonist (died 2017).
 22 – Heikki Sarmanto, Finnish jazz pianist, composer
 26 – George Braith, American saxophonist.
 30 – Tony Hatch, English composer, songwriter, pianist, arranger, and producer.

 July
 13 – György Szabados, Hungarian pianist (died 2011).
 16 – Denise LaSalle, African-American blues and R&B/soul singer, songwriter and record producer (d. 2018)
 18 – Brian Auger, English keyboardist.
 21 – Jamey Aebersold, American saxophonist and music educator.
 22 – Mario Rivera, Dominican saxophonist and multi-instrumentalist (died 2007).
 24 – Charles McPherson, American alto saxophonist.

 August
 9
 Butch Warren, American upright bassist (died 2013).
 Ove Stokstad, Norwegian printmaker, clarinetist and saxophonist (died 2018).
 12 – Mike Cotton, English trumpeter.
 16 – Mary Stallings, American vocalist.
 18 – Harald Heide-Steen Jr., (lung cancer), Norwegian actor, comedian and jazz singer (died 2008).
 19 – Ginger Baker, English drummer, Cream (died 2019).
 20 – Enrico Rava, Italian trumpeter.
 26 – Virgil Jones, American trumpeter (died 2012).
 31
 Cleveland Eaton, American upright bassist (died 2020).
 Paul Winter, American saxophonist.

 September
 9 – Zbigniew Namyslowski, Polish saxophonist, flautist, cellist, trombonist, and pianist.
 10 – Campbell Burnap, British trombonist and broadcaster (died 2008).
 13 – Elaine Delmar, English singer.
 18
 Kate Westbrook, English singer, English-horn player, and flautist.
 Steve Marcus, American saxophonist (died 2005).
 24 – Wayne Henderson, American trombonist (died 2014).

 October
 8 – Aladár Pege, Hungarian upright bassist (died 2006).
 14 – Chris Karan, Australian percussionist.
 15 – Joe Roccisano, American saxophonist and arranger (died 1997).
 16 – Andrzej Jastrzebski, Polish tubist.
 18 – Jan Erik Vold, Norwegian jazz poet.
 19 – Masabumi Kikuchi, Japanese pianist and composer (died 2015).
 28 – Andy Bey, American singer and pianist.
 31 – John Guerin, American percussionist (died 2004).

 November
 1 – Roger Kellaway,  American composer, arranger and pianist.
 3 – Joe McPhee, American multi-instrumentalist.
 6 – Carlos Emilio Morales, Cuban guitarist (died 2014).
 10
 Andrew Cyrille, American drummer.
 Hubert Laws, American flutist and saxophonist.
 13 – Idris Muhammad, American drummer (died 2014).
 16 – Henrik Otto Donner, Finnish composer and trumpeter (died 2013).
 19 – Tommy Stewart, American trumpeter.
 26
 Art Themen, British saxophonist.
 Greetje Kauffeld, Dutch singer.
 29
 Claudio Fasoli, Italian tenor and soprano  saxophonist, and composer
 Meco, American record producer and musician.

 December
 10 – Pekka Pöyry, Finnish saxophonist and flutist (died 1980).
 17 – James Booker, American keyboardist (died 1983).
 22 – Nick Ceroli, American drummer (died 1985).
 25
 Bob James, American pianist, keyboardist, arranger, and record producer. 
 Don Alias, American percussionist (died 2006).

 Unknown date
 David Batey, English pianist (died 2001).

References

External links 
 History Of Jazz Timeline: 1939 at All About Jazz

Jazz, 1939 In
Jazz by year